Paul Porter (December 23, 1907April 22, 2002) was a Michigan politician.

Early life
Porter was born on December 23, 1907.

Career
Porter was an alternate delegate to the Democratic National Convention from Michigan in 1968. In 1968, 1969, and 1970, Porter ran unsuccessfully for the Michigan House of Representatives seat representing the 41st district. In 1972 and 1976, Porter was run unsuccessfully for the position of presidential elector. On November 5, 1974, Porter was elected to the Michigan House of Representatives where he represented the 41st district from January 8, 1975 to December 31, 1978. Porter ran for this position again in 1978 and 1980, but was not re-elected. Porter was a delegate to the Democratic National Convention from Michigan in 1980. In 1982, Porter ran unsuccessfully for the Michigan Senate seat representing the 19th district.

Personal life
During his time in the Michigan Legislature, Porter lived in Quincy, Michigan.

Death
Porter died on April 22, 2002.

References

1907 births
2002 deaths
Democratic Party members of the Michigan House of Representatives
People from Quincy, Michigan
20th-century American politicians